Max Pinlig (Danish for Max Embarrassing) is a 2008 Danish film directed by  from a screenplay by Tommy Bredsted, Mette Horn and Lotte Svendsen, based on the Danish children's tv series Max that aired on DR1 from 2007 to 2008. It won the Robert Award for Best Children's Film at the 26th Robert Awards.

Premise 
Max has a crush on school classmate Ofelia, but he is too shy to tell her. Meanwhile, he becomes more popular with the cool kids at his school but has to stop hanging out with his old friends Esther and Hassan; the situation gets worse when Max's embarrassing mother intervenes.

Cast 
  as Max
  as Max's mother
 Lars Bom as Steen Cold
 Louise Mieritz as Ulla
 Rasmus Bjerg as Carlo
  as Esther
  as Hassan
 Ophelia Eriksen as Ofelia
 Signe Wenneberg as Signe Cold
 Anders Hove as Mogens
 Rasmus Berg Jensen as Nicklas
  as Marianne
 William Horn as William
 Sarah Muldgaard Enoch as Alma
 Lisa Littauer as Bibi
 Caroline Henderson as Ofelias tante

Release 
The film was released in Danish theatres on 5 December 2008 and sold a total of 163,473 tickets.

Accolades 
Max Pinlig won the Robert Award for Best Children's Film at the 26th Robert Awards. At the 62nd Bodil Awards, Mette Agnete Horn was nominated for Best Actress in a Leading Role, but lost to Lene Maria Christensen in Terribly Happy.

Sequels 

References

External links 
 
 Max Pinlig at the Danish Film Database (in Danish)

2008 films
Danish children's films
2000s children's films